Deirdre Lovejoy (born June 30, 1962) is an American actress.

She is best known for her role as Assistant State's Attorney Rhonda Pearlman on HBO’s The Wire. She is also known for her roles as a serial killer Heather Taffet (aka "The Gravedigger") on the Fox series Bones and White House Counsel Cynthia Panabaker on NBC's series The Blacklist.

Early life
Lovejoy was born in Abilene, Texas.  Her father was in the Air Force and worked from Dyess Air Force Base.

Lovejoy lived in Connecticut, then Pittsburgh, before moving with her mother to Elkhart, Indiana, while Lovejoy was still in the fourth grade. Her mother, Marcia Fulmer, met her second husband in Elkhart and worked as Arts and Entertainment editor at The Elkhart Truth. While in the fifth grade, Lovejoy played her first acting role as one of Big Daddy's grandchildren in an Elkhart Civic Theatre production of Cat on a Hot Tin Roof in which her mother played the part of Mae (aka "Sister Woman"). Lovejoy subsequently appeared in several productions at the Elkhart Civic Theatre, often alongside her mother.

In 1980 Lovejoy graduated from Elkhart Memorial High School. In 1984 she graduated from the University of Evansville with a double major in Theater and Communications. She also earned a Master of Fine Arts from the New York University Tisch School of the Arts three years later.

Career
In 1990 Lovejoy appeared in her first television role as Rosemary Kennedy in the ABC mini-series The Kennedys of Massachusetts. Throughout the 1990s and 2000s she appeared on such series as Law & Order, Seinfeld, Third Watch, Spin City, NYPD Blue, The West Wing, Cold Case and Law & Order: Special Victims Unit.

From 2002 to 2008 Lovejoy starred as Assistant State's Attorney Rhonda Pearlman on HBO’s The Wire. From 2009 to 2011 she played the recurring role of the serial kidnapper and murderer Heather Taffet (aka "The Gravedigger") on the television series Bones. In 2011 Lovejoy also appeared in the role of the mother of a student in the film Bad Teacher starring Cameron Diaz.

Lovejoy has also guest starred or held recurring roles on such TV series as Lie to Me, Law & Order: Criminal Intent, Criminal Minds, Body of Proof, Girls, Orange Is the New Black, American Gothic and Shameless.

Lovejoy has also appeared in several Broadway productions, including Six Degrees of Separation (1990), Getting and Spending (1998), The Gathering (2001) and Nora Ephron’s Lucky Guy starring Tom Hanks (2013).

In 2019, Lovejoy took part in Promethea in Prison, a theatrical project that involved a reading of the ancient Greek play Prometheus Bound. It featured an all-female cast that also included Sonja Sohn, one of Lovejoy's co-stars in The Wire. 

Also in 2019, Lovejoy starred in a one-person play she wrote, titled Bird Elephant China. The autobiographical play dealt with a series of unexplained seizures that Lovejoy experienced in 2009. The seizures affected her memory and her ability to walk and talk for almost a year. She also experienced hallucinations during this time. Lovejoy has been seizure free since 2009.

Filmography

Films

Television

References

External links 
 
 Official Site

Actresses from Texas
American film actresses
American television actresses
Living people
People from Abilene, Texas
University of Evansville alumni
Audiobook narrators
Tisch School of the Arts alumni
20th-century American actresses
21st-century American actresses
1962 births